List of football formations may refer to:
 Formation (association football)
 List of formations in American football